Artichoke Creek may refer to:

Artichoke Creek (Minnesota)
Artichoke Creek (South Dakota)